Charles W. Field (November 18, 1857 – May 20, 1917) was an American politician and lawyer from Maryland. He served in the Maryland House of Delegates, representing Baltimore, from 1892 to 1896.

Early life
Charles W. Field was born on November 18, 1857, near Fredericksburg, Virginia, to Monimia (née Mason) and General Charles W. Field. His ancestor Colonel John Field fought in the American Revolutionary War. His brother was Captain Mason Field. He was educated by his mother until the age of 14. Field then attended Bethel Military Academy. He read law in the office of his uncle J. J. Mason. Field graduated from the University of Virginia School of Law with a Bachelor of Laws in 1879. He was admitted to the bar in 1881.

Career
Field began practicing law in Baltimore. He served as counsel for the Board of Liquor License Commissioners in 1893. He established a partnership with Robert Clinton Cole in 1897. He served as counsel for the North German Lloyd Steamship Company and the Eastern Forwarding Company.

Field was a Democrat. He served in the Maryland House of Delegates, representing the City of Baltimore, from 1892 to 1896. He served as the first assistant city solicitor of Baltimore, in 1903.

Personal life
Field married Alberta L. Von Lingen in 1897. She was the daughter of George L. Von Lingen, former German Counsel. His wife died on December 8, 1916.

Field died on May 20, 1917, at Union Protestant Infirmary in Baltimore. He was buried at Green Mount Cemetery in Baltimore.

References

External links

1857 births
1917 deaths
People from Fredericksburg, Virginia
Politicians from Baltimore
University of Virginia School of Law alumni
Maryland lawyers
19th-century American politicians
20th-century American politicians